Lacinutrix gracilariae is a Gram-negative, aerobic and rod-shaped bacterium from the genus of Lacinutrix which has been isolated from the alga Gracilaria sp.

References 

Flavobacteria
Bacteria described in 2016